Charles P. Lloyd Jr. (born May 22, 1947) is a retired professional basketball player who spent one season in the American Basketball Association (ABA) as a member of the Carolina Cougars during the 1970–71 season. He attended Yankton College where he was drafted in the tenth round of the 1970 NBA Draft (159 pick overall) by the Seattle SuperSonics, but never signed. During his career, weighed 220 lbs., and stood 6'8".

References

External links
 

1947 births
Living people
American men's basketball players
Carolina Cougars players
Centers (basketball)
College men's basketball players in the United States
Power forwards (basketball)
Seattle SuperSonics draft picks
Yankton College alumni